Conya Doss (born June 13, 1972) is an American singer, songwriter, and multi-instrumentalist, and has been a major figure in independent music for over two decades. Conya is known as an innovator and is widely known for her eclectic work and light vocal range. She is known as The Queen of Indie Soul. Her music combines R&B, soul, funk, neo soul, and jazz.

Her first album A Poem About Ms. Doss was released in 2002. Over a course of years, she would release two more albums: Just Because (2004) and Love Rain Down (2006). Her breakthrough album Still... was released in 2008, which featured the lead single "What I'd Do". In 2010, Doss released her fifth album Blu Transition and followed up with A Pocketful of Purpose in 2012. Conya released her seventh album Seven: VII in 2015.

Early life 
Conya was born in Cleveland, Ohio, to Ronald Pruitt and Carolyn Pruitt. She developed an interest in music at an early age. After recording songs with her group "Lyrik", she pursued a solo career. Doss has been singing since she was five. She grew up listening to the likes of Bonnie Raitt, The Doobie Brothers, Stevie Wonder, Prince, Angela Winbush, Nina Simone, and Jane Child. She attended Cleveland School of the Arts along with Avant and 71 North and sang with childhood friend, Stacy Richardson-Crawford (former back-up singer for the late Gerald Levert and Anthony Hamilton in the duo Lyrik.  As an adult, Conya wrote for the group 3LW (singers of the hit song, "No more. Baby, I’ma Do Right"), and worked with Gerald Levert and PAJAM before venturing into a career as a solo artist. While receiving an undergraduate degree in chemistry. She later received her teaching credential and has become a teacher of children with special needs in the Cleveland Public School system. She began using music in her classroom as a way to connect with her students and her debut album A Poem About Ms. Doss was inspired by a heartfelt letter from one of her students.

Musical career

2001–2003: A Poem About Ms. Doss 
In 2001, Conya Doss started her own recording label Conya Doss Songs and began recording her first album. In 2002, Doss released her first singles "Good Good" and "Coffee" which were followed by the release of her album, entitled A Poem About Ms. Doss. The album also spawned the singles "Starship" and "You Really Hurt Me". Doss later began performing at several Midwest venues. In February 2003, Doss performed at Cleveland's Rock and Roll Hall of Fame. For her debut album she received 3 Stars in USA Today where music critic Steve Jones said "No matter what twists and turns relationships may take, they never seem to make this honey-voiced newcomer from Cleveland lose heart. Doss stirs emotions on her inventive first single, "Coffee", and takes a loving nod toward her soul/jazz roots with a cover of Norman Connors' Starship. Her poem is a smooth and sexy one worth more than just a cursory reading."

2003–2005: Just Because 
In 2003, Doss returned to the studio to begin recording for her second album. In 2004, Doss released the single "Missin' You". The single created a buzz for her upcoming album, Just Because which was released in November 2004.

2005–2007: Love Rain Down 
In 2005, Doss began recording sessions for her third album. After a two-year hiatus, she released her third album, Love Rain Down in October 2006. Shortly after the album's release, Doss began touring and performing at worldwide venues. In 2007, Doss performed the album's lead single "Tell Me Why" on BET J.

2008–2009: Still... 
In May 2008, Doss released her lead single "What I'd Do". The song received airplay from local radio stations, charted on Billboard and also received airplay from BET J's Soul Sessions. The song earned Doss a nomination for "Best Underground Artist" at the BET J Virtual Awards alongside Eric Roberson, Vikter Duplaix and Rahsaan Patterson... In April 2008, Doss released her fourth studio album, entitled Still. The album also spawned a second single "It's Over", which listed her for iTunes' "Best R&B Indie Track". She later appeared on PBS and performed her singles "Tell Me Why", "Message", "It's Over".

In 2009, Doss began promoting her third single "Can't Stop". She later performed the song in dedication of her late friend at local venues. In June 2009, Doss toured with Yahzarah, Sy Smith, Maya Azucena on the Soulsista Tour.

2010–2011: Blu Transition 
In August 2010, Doss revealed the recording sessions for her fifth album entitled Blu Transition. In late August 2010, she released her buzz single "What We Gone Do" to Soultracks as the Free Choice Track Download. It became "Song of the Month" in September 2010 while the single received 4000 digital downloads in one month, setting a new record on Soultracks since Lalah Hathaway in 2008. In September 2010, Doss released her fifth album "Blu Transition".

2012–2013: A Pocketful of Purpose 
In January 2012, Doss released the first single "Don't Change" from her sixth album. In March 2012, she released a song called "Paradise" to Soultracks. On March 20, 2012, Doss released the music video of "Don't Change" to YouTube. In April 2012, she released her sixth album A Pocketful of Purpose.

2015–present: Seven: VII 
On August 26, 2014, Doss set the tone for the album's release with the well-received single "You Got Me", a reflective love song to a significant other.  The Singer/Songwriter says "Seven is my Life Path number and reminds listeners that there are seven fundamental notes on the scale which creates musical movements."  Fueled by a desire to lay down tracks that parallel her evolving musical and personal trajectory, her seventh project is a collection of up-tempo and slow jams sure to please her anticipating fans. In January 2015, she released the next single "When We Love" followed by "Love’s Not" which tells a familiar story of one who has built a protective wall yet still believes that love has not forsaken them.

Style 
Doss' stage presence consists of her afro style hair. Doss can be classified as an alto and falsetto. Doss demonstrates her alto range in songs like "Something 2Nite", "It's Over", and "Starship", whereas in songs like "Message", "Good Good", "I Miss You" is where she demonstrates her falsetto range. She cites Stevie Wonder, Donnie Hathaway, Chaka Khan, Prince, Steely Dan, Natalie Cole, Sade, Jodeci, Rude Boys, Lauryn Hill, and D'Angelo as her musical inspirations.

Personal life 
In 2010, Doss gave birth to her son named Landon Blu. She named her fifth album after him.

Philanthropy 
Conya also mentors teen girls, tutors, and is an active philanthropist for breast cancer, HIV/AIDS, and mental health awareness.  On March 8, at the House of Blues, in Chicago, she performed to benefit the AIDS Foundation of Chicago. She has been an ambassador for BET's Rap-It-UP campaign and in 2013, joined Brandy Norwood and Civil Rights leader, Julian Bond for the "Keep The Promise" March & Rally in Ohio, U.S.

Discography 
Studio albums
 A Poem About Ms. Doss (2002)
 Just Because (2004)
 Love Rain Down (2006)
 Still... (2008)
 Blu Transition (2010)
 A Pocketful of Purpose (2012)
 Seven: VII (2015)
 Clear (2018)

Singles
 2002: "Coffee"
 2002: "Good Good"
 2003: "Starship"
 2004: "Missin' You"
 2004: "Damn That"
 2004: "Sweet Love (I Don't Know)"
 2005: "Ain't Giving Up"
 2005: "Here We Go Again"
 2006: "Tell Me Why"
 2006: "Let You Know"
 2008: "What I'd Do" (reached #79 on Billboard's R&B chart)
 2008: "It's Over"
 2009: "Can't Stop"
 2010: "What We Gone Do"
 2010: "All in You"
 2011: "Wi-Fi"
 2012: "Don't Change" (reached #72 on Billboard's R&B chart)
 2012: "Where Do Go From Here?" (featuring Frank McComb)
 2014: "Here For You"
 2014: "You Got Me"
 2015: "Love's Not"
 2015: "When We Love"
 2015: "Reach Out"
 2021: "Long Haul"

Tours 
 2003: Conya Doss Tour
 2007: Love Rain Down Tour
 2008: Still... Tour
 2009: Soulsista Tour (with Sy Smith, Yahzarah, and Maya Azucena)
 2011: Blu Transition Tour

Awards and nominations 
These are the awards won by American R&B singer Conya Doss.

References

External links
Official website

1972 births
Living people
African-American women singer-songwriters
African-American record producers
American women record producers
Record producers from Ohio
African-American schoolteachers
American women educators
Schoolteachers from Ohio
American rhythm and blues singer-songwriters
American neo soul singers
Singer-songwriters from Ohio
Musicians from Cleveland
American contemporary R&B singers
21st-century American women singers
Ballad musicians
21st-century American singers
21st-century African-American women
20th-century African-American people
20th-century African-American women